Marcelle Bittar de Almeida (born May 5, 1981), better known as Marcelle Bittar, is a Brazilian model of Lebanese descent. She was born in Guarapuava, Paraná, Brazil.

In 1996, Bittar was registered by her mother in an Elite Model Management contest and subsequently joined the agency casting at only 14 years old. Her other agencies include Ford (New York, Miami), Women (Milan), Select (London), Mega (Hamburg), and Ten Model Management Agency, which is her mother's agency. In 2001, Bittar was nominated for the Abit Fashion Awards for the best female model. That same year, she participated in the São Paulo Fashion Week/Breast Cancer campaign at Alvo da Moda. She has walked for designers such as Alexander McQueen and Ellus, appeared in Victoria's Secret Fashion Show in 2003, and has been photographed by Mario Testino. As of 2016, was still modelling. She has also hosted a TV show.

References

External links

 Pix Magazine - Interview

1981 births
Living people
Brazilian people of Lebanese descent
Brazilian people of Portuguese descent
Brazilian female models
People from Guarapuava
21st-century Brazilian women